The Brattain–Hadley House was located in Springfield, Oregon, United States, and was formerly listed on the National Register of Historic Places. Fire destroyed much of the house in 1997, and in 2012 a demolition contractor removed the house for safety reasons.

Paul Brattain, an 1852 pioneer, obtained a 160-acre donation land claim soon after moving from Iowa to Oregon. The Brattain farm was entirely within modern Springfield city limits.

When Brattain died in 1893, his descendants built the Queen Anne style house. Paul Hadley, Brattain's grandson, was the last of Brattain's descendants to occupy the house in the 1940s. Hadley's daughter, Mary Hadley Callis, allowed vagrants to occupy the house until the 1997 fire.  The house was removed from the National Register on May 8, 2012.

See also
 National Register of Historic Places listings in Lane County, Oregon

References

1893 establishments in Oregon
Former National Register of Historic Places in Oregon
Houses completed in 1893
Houses in Lane County, Oregon
Queen Anne architecture in Oregon
Springfield, Oregon
National Register of Historic Places in Lane County, Oregon